Pittocaulon is a genus of Mexican shrubs and small trees in the tribe Senecioneae within the family Asteraceae.

Pittocaulon is native to the dry parts of central and southern Mexico. In addition to the strange appearance of these plants, Pittocaulon is of interest due to the remarkable range of habitats in which the species occur, from dry highland scrub well above 3000 meters, to tropical dry forest in hot country as low as 300 meters and on rocks, often in very steep situations.  Pittocaulon species are conspicuous when they flower at the end of the dry season  are popularly called "palo loco" or "crazy tree", because they flower at the very end of the dry season when most other plants are suffering the effects of drought.

 Species 
 Pittocaulon bombycophole (Bullock) H.Rob. & Brettell - Guerrero, México State
 Pittocaulon filare (McVaugh) H.Rob. & Brettell - Colima
 Pittocaulon hintonii H.Rob. & Brettell - Michoacán
 Pittocaulon velatum (Greenm.) H.Rob. & Brettell - Guerrero, Nayarit, Oaxaca, Zacatecas

 formerly included
see Roldana Senecio 
 Pittocaulon calzadanum B.L.Turner - Roldana eriophylla (Greenm.) H.Rob. & Brettell
 Pittocaulon praecox (Cav.) H.Rob. & Brettell  - Senecio praecox (Cav.) DC.

References

External links

Senecioneae
Endemic flora of Mexico
Asteraceae genera